Helmuth Förster (19 April 1889 – 7 April 1965) was a German general in the Luftwaffe during World War II. A decorated World War I aviator, he returned to military service in 1934 as an Oberstleutnant in the Luftwaffe. Promoted to Oberst in 1936, he was appointed to command the 4th Bomber Wing. During the invasion of Poland, Förster commanded the Lehrdivision with significant success. He was then appointed as chief of staff of the 5th Air Fleet during the invasion of Norway. After serving on the German-French Peace Commission, he was appointed as military governor of the German-occupied territory of Serbia from April to June 1941, then commanded the 1st Air Corps during the invasion of the Soviet Union until October 1942. Whilst in command of the 1st Air Corps he was awarded the Knight's Cross of the Iron Cross. He spent the remainder of the war as chief of administration at the Reich Ministry of Aviation. He was pensioned as an Oberstleutnant in 1952.

Awards and decorations

 Knight's Cross of the Iron Cross on 22 February 1942 as General der Flieger and commander of I. Flieger-Korps

Footnotes

References

 
 
 

1889 births
1965 deaths
People from Strzelce Opolskie
People from the Province of Silesia
Luftwaffe World War II generals
German Army personnel of World War I
Prussian Army personnel
Recipients of the Knight's Cross of the Iron Cross
German prisoners of war in World War II
Recipients of the clasp to the Iron Cross, 1st class
Generals of Aviators